is a Japanese engineering scientist.

Contribution
Arata substantially contributed to develop a new interdisciplinary field by harmonizing molecular biology, analytical chemistry, biophysics and plant/agricultural sciences, with microengineering and nanoscience. He is the inventor of free rotation magnetic tweezers (FRMT) and is the first to observe a DNA twist by a single biomolecule by FRMT. He actively giving lectures at universities and research institutes worldwide, such as École Normale Supérieure (Paris), University of Tokyo, Peking University, ETH Zurich, Stanford University, Harvard University, and Massachusetts Institute of Technology. He serves as an editor in multiple academic journals such as The Journal of Engineering (UK), Frontiers in Bioscience (USA), Frontiers in Bioengineering and Biotechnology.

Biography
Arata's family is the male line descendant of the Prince of Goeku in Ryukyu Kingdom, Shô Ryûtoku, the fourth prince of the King Shō Shin. He spent his childhood in Belmont, Massachusetts, while his father worked at Harvard University under Martin Karplus. Yoko Gushiken, a famous Tarento in Japan and former Light flyweight boxing champion of World Boxing Association (WBA), is his relative.

After graduating from Japanese La Salle Academy, he received his BS, MS, and PhD degrees all in electrical engineering, specialized in MEMS and Bio-MEMS, from the University of Tokyo. In accordance with the advice by Phillip Allen Sharp, he moved into the field of single molecule biophysics under the advisory of Jean-Louis Viovy at Curie Institute (Paris). After his postdoctoral training at Harvard–MIT Division of Health Sciences and Technology, and at RIKEN, he was appointed as a Group Leader/Designated Associate Professor at Graduate School of Science, Nagoya University in 2011. In 2014, he had an appointment as a visiting scholar (visiting associate professor) at Harvard University with David Weitz.

His serious activity as an amateur pianist drove American composer Frederic Rzewski to dedicate Nanosonata (2006) to him. He also actively held concerts, such as “Okinawa-US friendship concert” at the base chapel in Camp Courtney, a U.S. Marine Base located in Uruma City, by the attendance of the commanding officer. During his stay in Paris, he studied the piano under Olivier Gardon. He also studied under Pascal Rogé and Philippe Entremont at Conservatoire de Nice summer academie, and Gabriel Tacchino at Mozarteum University of Salzburg.

Honors and awards
Arata received numerous awards including Young Engineers Award by the Japan Society of Mechanical Engineers (jp) (2005, the youngest awardee), Young Innovator Award by CHEMINAS (jp) (2013), ITbM Research Award (2014), The Japan Society for Analytical Chemistry Award for Younger Researchers(jp)  (2014), Ishida Prize by Nagoya University (2014), and The Young Scientists' Prize by Minister of Education, Culture, Sports, Science and Technology (2015). He is an alumnus of the 61st. Lindau Nobel Laureate Meetings, when he honored the support from Boehringer Ingelheim Foundation and Japan Society for the Promotion of Science. He also acted as an Alumuni peer reviewer of the 70th. meeting (2021).

References

External links
Hematology Times Nov. 11th. 2012

Japanese nanotechnologists
Japanese scientists
Japanese electrical engineers
Japanese biophysicists
Japanese physicists
Academic staff of Nagoya University
University of Tokyo alumni
People from Okinawa Prefecture
1980 births
Living people
Riken personnel